Brian Michael John Young (born 10 September 1954) served as magistrate of the British Overseas Territory of Pitcairn Island from December 1984 until 1 January 1991. In 2007 Young was found guilty of rape and indecent assault, and was sentenced to six years and six months in prison.

Ancestry

References

Pitcairn Islands politicians
1954 births
Living people
Pitcairn Islands people of Saint Kitts and Nevis descent
Pitcairn Islands people of Scottish descent
Pitcairn Islands people of Manx descent
Pitcairn Islands people of English descent
Pitcairn Islands people of American descent
Pitcairn Islands people convicted of rape
Politicians convicted of sex offences